White Shark is a 1994 novel by author Peter Benchley, famous for Jaws, The Island, Beast and The Deep. It is similar to Jaws, but it does not feature a shark, despite what the title suggests. To avoid confusion and to capitalize on the miniseries adaptation, the book was republished as Creature in 1997.

Plot
At the close of World War II, Nazi scientist Ernst Kruger perfects a biological weapon he calls Der Weisse Hai ("the White Shark"). The weapon is packed in a casket-like box and loaded aboard a German submarine to escape the Allied capture of Germany.  When the submarine is attacked and sunk in the Atlantic Ocean, all hands, including Kruger, and the box containing Der Weisse Hai are lost at sea.

Decades later, unsuspecting divers find the wreckage of the German submarine and recover the box, becoming the Great White Shark's first victims and inadvertently releasing it into the waters off Long Island, where it kills sea mammals, pets and random people.  The novel's protagonist, a marine biologist named Dr. Simon Chase, examines several of the victim's corpses and concludes that the attacker can't be a sea creature, since its teeth and claws leave metallic traces.

The creature's exact nature is not described or revealed until near the climax, when Jacob Franks, a Holocaust survivor, tracks down the protagonist and reveals he was forced to assist Kruger's experiments to create an amphibious human to act as the ultimate commando soldier.  All of Kruger's test subjects were too weak to survive the experiments, until they were given a psychotic SS officer and ex-Olympic triathlete, who was surgically altered and psychologically manipulated into becoming Der Weisse Hai, including the implantation of steel claws and teeth.  Before sealing him into the box, Kruger also put the Shark into a hibernation state, which enabled him to survive the decades following the war.  Franks also explains that Kruger had taught the Shark how to drain his lungs and breathe air, but not how to reverse the process, meaning that once the Shark comes ashore, he will be unable to return to the water.  Alarmed, Chase reveals to Franks that this has already occurred.

Chase and his helper lure the Shark into a decompression chamber and explode him.

Miniseries adaptation
White Shark was adapted into a 1997 miniseries called Creature. The film was set at a top secret island military base instead of a science lab. Additionally, instead of an amphibious human, the titular creature was redesigned as a human/great white shark hybrid capable of evolving legs, arms and lungs. It starred Craig T. Nelson as Simon Chase and Kim Cattrall as Dr. Amanda Mason (instead of Macy). It was primarily filmed on the Caribbean island of St. Lucia and in Vancouver. To take advantage of the movie's publicity and to avoid confusion with sharks, the book was republished as Creature in 1997.

References

External links

1994 American novels
Random House books
Novels by Peter Benchley
Novels set in Long Island
American horror novels
Jaws (franchise)
American novels adapted into television shows
Experimental medical treatments in fiction
Nautical novels